Feigned action is an action brought on a pretended right, when the plaintiff has no true cause of action, for some illegal purpose. In a feigned action the words of the writ are true; it differs from false action, in which case the words of the writ are false.

Co. Litt. 361, sect. 689. Vide Fictitious action.

References
Bouviers Law Dictionary 1856 Edition

Legal terminology